

340001–340100 

|-id=071
| 340071 Vanmunster ||  || Tonny Vanmunster (born 1961), a Belgian amateur astronomer. || 
|}

340101–340200 

|-bgcolor=#f2f2f2
| colspan=4 align=center | 
|}

340201–340300 

|-bgcolor=#f2f2f2
| colspan=4 align=center | 
|}

340301–340400 

|-bgcolor=#f2f2f2
| colspan=4 align=center | 
|}

340401–340500 

|-id=479
| 340479 Broca ||  || Pierre Paul Broca (1824–1880) was a French physician, anatomist and anthropologist. He is best known for his research on Broca's area, a region of the frontal lobe of the hominid brain that has been named after him. || 
|}

340501–340600 

|-bgcolor=#f2f2f2
| colspan=4 align=center | 
|}

340601–340700 

|-bgcolor=#f2f2f2
| colspan=4 align=center | 
|}

340701–340800 

|-bgcolor=#f2f2f2
| colspan=4 align=center | 
|}

340801–340900 

|-id=891
| 340891 Londoncommorch ||  || The London Community Orchestra (Orchestra London Canada), founded in London, Canada in 1974  (Src) || 
|}

340901–341000 

|-id=929
| 340929 Bourgelat ||  || Claude Bourgelat (1712–1779) was a French veterinary surgeon. He was the founder of the Lyon veterinary college in 1761, the first veterinary school in the world. || 
|-id=980
| 340980 Bad Vilbel ||  || Bad Vilbel, a spa town in Hesse, Germany, known for its mineral springs || 
|}

References 

340001-341000